TechPowerUp GPU-Z (or just GPU-Z) is a lightweight utility designed to provide information about video cards and GPUs. The program displays the specifications of Graphics Processing Unit (often shortened to GPU) and its memory; also displays temperature, core frequency, memory frequency, GPU load and fan speeds.

Features 
This program allows to view the following information of the video card:
 Graphics Card's Name
 Fake GPU detection
 GPU Internal Codename
 Technology Process
 Chip Die Size
 Number of Transistors
 Support for DirectX / Pixel Shader
 Memory Type
 Amount of Video Memory
 Memory bandwidth
 Type of Bus
 Width of the Bus
 Frequency of the GPU (default / overclocked)
 Memory Clock
 Driver Version
 BIOS Version
 Sensors
 GPU Core Clock
 GPU Memory Clock
 Low GPU 
 Fan Speed
 Nvidia SLI/AMD CrossFire

See also 
CPU-Z

References

External links
 

Computer performance
Utilities for Windows
Windows-only freeware
Windows-only software